Doug Ball is a Canadian photojournalist.

Famous photos
 Robert Stanfield's fumble. Doug Ball 1974 photo of Conservative Leader/candidate fumbling a football is said to have cost him (and the Conservative Party) the election. The Canadian Press sent the picture across Canada where the photo was played on many front pages.
 Pierre Trudeau's pirouette. The 1977 photo shows Canadian Prime Minister Pierre Trudeau, in Buckingham Palace, doing a pirouette behind  Queen Elizabeth II and members of the G7 at the Summit Conference in London, England. This photo is arguably the most famous photo of Trudeau. "The picture, we have been led to believe, expresses his maverick anti-conformism, his democratic disdain for aristocratic pomp."

References

Canadian photojournalists
Canadian photographers
Living people
Year of birth missing (living people)